Nemapogon sardicus is a moth of the family Tineidae. It is found on Sardinia.

References

Moths described in 1983
Nemapogoninae
Endemic fauna of Sardinia